Beytüşşebap is a town and seat of Beytüşşebap District of Şırnak Province in Turkey. The town had a population of 5,340 in 2021. It is populated by Kurds of the Ertoşî, Geravî, Jirkî, Mamxûran and Pinyanîşî tribes.

The mayor is Habip Aşan of the Justice and Development Party (AKP) and District Governor (Kaymakam), Hasan Meşel serves since September 2020 after he was appointed by Recep Tayyip Erdoğan.

Neighborhoods 
Beytüşşebap is divided into the neighborhoods of Ali Çavuş, Elki, Karşıyaka and Pınarbaşı.

Beytüşşebap rebellion 

 See Beytussebab rebellion

References

Populated places in Şırnak Province
Kurdish settlements in Şırnak Province
Towns in Turkey